Ernstichthys anduzei is a species of banjo catfish endemic to the Orinoco River basin of Venezuela.  It grows to a length of 3.5 cm.

References 
 

Aspredinidae
Fish of Venezuela
Taxa named by Augustín Fernández-Yépez
Fish described in 1953